is a Japanese politician of the Liberal Democratic Party, a member of the House of Representatives in the Diet (national legislature). A native of Iwaki, Fukushima and graduate of Waseda University, he was elected to the first of his three terms in the assembly of Fukushima Prefecture in 1987 and then to the House of Representatives for the first time in 2000. In 2012, he won a seat in the House of Representatives for the Chugoku region, and in 2014 returned to Fukushima which he has represented since 2014.

On 26 April 2017, he became the minister responsible for disaster reconstruction in the Tohoku Region, after the previous minister, Masahiro Imamura, resigned after making insensitive remarks about the 2011 earthquake and tsunami which had hit the Tohoku region.

References 
 

Notes

External links
 Official website in Japanese.

Living people
1948 births
Liberal Democratic Party (Japan) politicians
Members of the House of Representatives (Japan)
21st-century Japanese politicians